The Mount Tabor Indian Community (also Texas Cherokees and Associate Bands of the Mount Tabor Indian Community) is a cultural heritage group located in Rusk County, Texas. There was a historical Mount Tabor Indian Community dating from the 19th century. The current organization established a nonprofit organization in Texas in 2015.

The modern community identifies as being of Cherokee descent as well as Choctaw, Chickasaw, and Muscogee descent. They are descended from a few Cherokee who had migrated to Texas prior to the Cherokee War of 1839 under Duwa'li, or The Bowl.  Additionally, the main body of the original Cherokee community was made up of Old Settler and Treaty Party (Ridge Party) Cherokee from Indian Territory.  Between 1847 and 1853 they were joined by the remnants of other southeast tribes, such as the Choctaw, Chickasaw and Muscogee/Creek.

These Cherokee from Indian Territory, both the Old Settler and Ridge Party groups, left the Cherokee Nation due to internal political conflicts resulting from their forced removal from the Nation's eastern homeland (that culminated in the Starr War).  The Old Settlers and the Ridge Party sought a separation from the dominant Ross faction of the Cherokee Nation in order to seek peace for their families.

In 1845 United States President James Polk issued an order for these two groups to seek lands suitable to settle on in Texas.  Following the establishment of the community some six miles south of present-day Kilgore, Texas, the Cherokee were soon joined by Yowani Choctaw, intermarried Chickasaw, and McIntosh Party Creek Indians.

Today the band is made up of those descendants that continue to reside there. The band's current headquarters is in Kilgore, Texas, with significant populations near New London, Overton, Arp, and Troup, Texas.

Historic tribal groups 

Descendants of the four American Indian tribes that make up the Mount Tabor Indian Community have a shared experience in the colonization of the American Southeast by Europeans. From the early nineteenth century they suffered constant encroachment by frontier settlers of the United States, and then suffered the Indian Removal through the 1830s, that culminated in the Trail of Tears. Hailing from different language groups, the Cherokee, Choctaw, Chickasaw and Creek refugees came together in Texas, forming a loose-knit—but well defined—Native community.  It was initially numerically dominated by Cherokee Indians; however, since 1900 the majority of the band have been of ethnic Choctaw and Chickasaw ancestry.

The four tribes that combined as the Mount Tabor Indian Community since the late 19th century migrated in stages to east Texas. The first were a few survivors of the Cherokee War. With the violation of the Treaty of Bowles Village on February 23, 1836, between the Republic of Texas and the Texas Cherokee, the Texian Army ruthlessly pushed the Cherokee and allied Lenape (Delaware) and Shawnee Indians from the treaty lands, scattering them to multiple locations.

A band of Cherokee sought refuge in Monclova, Coahuila, Mexico, led by Fox Fields and Chicken Trotter.  From there, along with their Mexican liaison, Vicente Córdova, the Texas Cherokee fought an irregular war against the Texians from 1840 until hostilities ceased after the signing of the 1843 Treaty of Bird's Fort.

A combined force of Texas Cherokee, Choctaw, Caddo and Mexican militia saw action against the Texas Republic at San Patricio and Corpus Christi, with the final confrontations coming with General Adrián Woll's invasion of San Antonio de Bexar in September 1842.  There, they were involved in the defeat of the Dawson Expedition, as well as the loss at the Battle of Salado Creek.  Eighteen Cherokee were killed along with military liaison Córdova.  Shortly after this, Sam Houston returned as president of the Republic of Texas, and the Texas Cherokee sought peace.

During this same period, the larger Cherokee Nation had carried their internal rivalries after removal to their new lands in Indian Territory. The followers of Major Ridge, who had formed the Treaty or Ridge Party that signed the Treaty of New Echota, clashed with the new arrivals who came after the Trail of Tears and forced removal by the United States. The followers of Principal Chief John Ross had initially opposed removal, and carried out their capital sentence against persons who had ceded their lands, as they saw it. The Ridge Party had accepted the treaty and removal because they thought to do otherwise was to risk the destruction of the greater Cherokee Nation. A third Cherokee faction were the Old Settlers, who had earlier migrated to the west, first to Arkansas and then to Indian Territory, before the signing of the Treaty of New Echota. They had established a functioning government separate from their eastern kinsmen.

While the Old Settler and Ridge Party had cooperated, the arrival of the much larger Ross faction threw all of Indian Territory into chaos. After the Ross faction Cherokee assassinated Major Ridge and some of his allies, carrying out what they considered a capital sentence, the Old Settler and Ridge Party party factions sought relief. First, they proposed a division of the Cherokee Nation, with the southern part going to the Old Settlers and Ridge Party, and the north to the Ross supporters, forming two separate Cherokee governments. That idea was rejected by the federal government. But in 1845, United States President James K. Polk issued an Executive Order granting both Old Settler and Ridge Party factions permission to send a delegation to Texas to find land suitable for them to settle on.

The Republic of Texas was still a separate nation and had its own ideas about desirable settlers. The arrival of the immigrant Cherokee led to a tense period. It had been only five years since the Cherokee War and a little over a year since Chicken Trotter had signed a new treaty with Texas at Birds Fort ending hostilities.

The Old Settler-Ridge Party delegation was led by John Harnage, James Starr, J.L. Thompson, and John Adair Bell. Also known as John "Jack" Bell, he was a brother of both Devereaux Jarrett Bell and Sam Bell, who had remained in Texas after the Cherokee War. John Adair Bell, also known as Jack, had been one of the signatories of the Treaty of New Echota. These two groups met those that had been in Monclova prior to the Treaty of Birds Fort near the Brazos River in what was then, West Texas.

At that time, the Cherokee were prohibited from owning land in the old Bowles treaty area of Republic of Texas. Devereaux Bell had been trying to find lands since 1840 but none could have been large enough to secure a homeland for those wanting to leave Indian Territory. To solve this problem, Benjamin Franklin Thompson, the European-American husband of Annie Martin, a Cherokee woman, purchased  of land for the community near what is now Kilgore, Texas. Her father John Martin served as the First Chief Justice of the Cherokee Nation.  With this purchase and a similar purchase to the south of the Thompson land by Jesse Mayfield, another European American married to a Cherokee woman, the Cherokee effectively occupied a new homeland. Mayfield's wife was Sarah Starr, the great granddaughter of Beloved Woman Nancy Ward.

By the summer of 1847 until the mid 1850s, families began the trek to Texas and safety. With the Thompson and Mayfield lands now available and Texas annexation into the United States, those remaining in the Cherokee Nation–east, still fearing reprisals for the Treaty of New Echota, had a secure home and thus the Mount Tabor Indian Community was founded. The original Mount Tabor village was located just over four miles south of where present-day downtown Kilgore developed in Rusk County, Texas. It appears to have been established on or near the former village of Chief Richard Fields, which had been led by his son Fox Fields at the time of the Cherokee War.  Annie Martin-Thompson was the niece of Chief Fields.

Between 1847 and 1855, numerous Cherokee families settled in Mount Tabor and Bellview, a settlement they developed. By 1850 families of Choctaw and related Chickasaw, who had been living in southern Rusk County, came to seek refuge with the Cherokee. A group of Muscogee (Creek) of the McIntosh Party also headed south from Indian Territory after being threatened by an anti-removal Creek leader named Tuskeenhaw.  The McIntosh Party were a Creek pro-removal group similar to the Cherokee Ridge Party.

The Choctaw were led initially by Jeremiah Jones, followed in 1853 by Archibald Thompson. The Muscogee were led by William and Thomas Berryhill, whose families had been tied to Broken Arrow and Horse Path towns in the former Creek Nation in the Southeast.

With the annexation of Texas into the United States of America, Indians were allowed to own lands in the state. John Adair Bell soon purchased land just south of the Benjamin F. Thompson purchase. He wrote in a letter to his brother-in-law Stand Watie, "I call my place Mount Taber", listing his address as Mount Taber, Texas.  This was the first documented reference to the community.  As the community grew, it flourished.  That would change as the members became caught up in the American Civil War.

American Civil War

The entire band allied with the Confederate States, with most Cherokee serving under General Stand Watie, who had lived for short periods at Mount Tabor.  His wife, Sarah Caroline Bell-Watie, lived there in 1863 with her sister Nancy Bell and brother-in-law George Harlan Starr.  While most of the Cherokee males of Mount Tabor served with the Second Cherokee Mounted Rifles under Watie and former Mount Tabor resident, Colonel William Penn Adair, some chose to serve with other Texas units.  John Martin Thompson organized units at Bellview, which comprised Cherokee as well as Choctaw and intermarried whites.  The band suffered greatly during the war. They suffered war-related shortages, and a number of Cherokee, mostly women and children related to members of Watie's command, fled to Rusk County deep in Texas for refuge. The band's limited resources became strained.

Following the war and the death of John Ross in 1866, the Cherokee Nation passed a "right of return" for members who wanted to rejoin the Nation. Between 1866 and 1890, more than 80% of the Cherokee left Mount Tabor to return to the Cherokee Nation in Indian Territory. The Choctaw and Muscogee had different reactions after the war. Most of the Berryhill and related families were scattered throughout Texas and western Louisiana, with groups in Limestone and Angelina counties in Texas and Natchitoches Parish in Louisiana. Another sizable group headed north to the Muscogee (Creek) Nation, putting down roots near what is known as Eufaula, Oklahoma. The Choctaw met with considerable resistance from authorities in Indian Territory.

Dawes Commission
Some Yowani Choctaw had left Texas shortly after their village on Attoyac Bayou was attacked and eleven members massacred by white vigilantes from Nacogdoches in 1840. They settled in the southern Chickasaw Nation not far from Ardmore, Oklahoma near Houani Creek. Around 1885 William Clyde Thompson, along with John Thurston Thompson Jr., Winburn Jones, and Martin Luther Thompson, led Choctaw from Rusk and neighboring Smith County, Texas to the Ardmore area in the Chickasaw Nation. They wanted to register as members in the Choctaw Nation during enrollment on the Dawes Rolls.

While all the Texas Choctaw relocating to Indian Territory were initially enrolled on the Final Roll of the Choctaw Nation, they were later stricken. Initially listed as Mississippi Choctaw, their status was later changed to MCR (Mississippi-Choctaw-Rejected). Tribal officials said they no longer belonged, as they and the related Jena Choctaw in Louisiana, had not been in Mississippi for multiple generations. But their ancestors had been parties to previous Choctaw treaties with the US while still residing in Mississippi. The Department of the Interior acknowledged the Choctaw ancestry but the Choctaw Advisory Board wanted to admit only those relocating from Mississippi. The Jena Band of Choctaw Indians in Louisiana faced the same rejection. It was not until 1995 that the Jena Choctaw were finally federally recognized as a distinct tribe.

Martin Luther Thompson and others returned to Rusk County, living there for the remainder of their lives.  Those who had stayed with William Clyde Thompson and settled near the town of Marlow, fought the issue all the way to the United States Supreme Court. The court sided with these Choctaw, and they were entered on a reinstatement list, restoring their Choctaw citizenship. Some 70 Texas Choctaw from Mount Tabor were recognized as "Choctaw by Blood" and citizens of that nation. But unlike the Cherokee, most Choctaw and Chickasaw of Mount Tabor remained in the east Texas tribal community.

During this same period, Caleb Starr Bean, who served as the Mount Tabor community chief, sought to gain enrollment on the Dawes Roll for the remaining Mount Tabor people. He was unsuccessful for Rusk and Smith County Cherokees, as the enrollment was based on physical residence in the Cherokee Nation.

Enrollment on the Guion Miller Roll, which was a payment roll based upon previous treaties, was open to all Cherokee listed on the 1835 Cherokee census taken at the time of Indian Removal. Those who were or had ancestors among the original Texas Cherokee, as well as the Choctaw and Muscogee, were not eligible. Those who did not remove to Texas until after the Cherokee arrived in Indian Territory in 1839, were eligible. Chief Caleb Bean worked diligently to insure that all known Mount Tabor Cherokee people who were eligible, had a chance to apply for Guion Miller enrollment.

He died in 1902 before the roll was closed, but his brother John Ellis Bean became the next community chief and took over his efforts. Chief John Bean kept the tribal organization together under what were increasingly hard times: the land was not producing well; and the forests had been largely harvested by lumber companies owned by the Thompsons. The Thompson and Tucker Lumber Company, owned by John Martin Thompson, dominated in the region.

Texas Cherokees and Associate Bands
Shortly after the Civil War, former Mount Tabor resident William Penn Adair, reorganized the Texas Cherokees and Associate Bands. This organization, which was started in Mount Tabor in the 1850s, was established to pursue redress from the violations of the Treaty of Bowles Village in 1836. The State of Texas initially offered some fifteen million acres of Texas Panhandle land, on the condition that the Texas Cherokees and Associate Bands drop any further legal action related to the treaty. Adair refused.

The lands now occupied by the Texas Cherokees had become a new homeland. Many of the community's ancestors were buried there, and the people were doing relatively well in East Texas. Whey they assessed the lands offered, they took into account that these 15 million acres were occupied by the Comanche and Kiowa peoples. They would have reacted to Tabor or other Texas Cherokee as intruders. War would have been inevitable. Adair thought this was unacceptable. Before the Texas revolution, the Mexican government had offered similar land, in order for the Texas Cherokee to move west and form a barrier to the Comanche, Lipan Apache, and other tribes. That had been rejected by The Bowl and Adair followed suit.

Following the war, with a Confederate Cherokee delegation in Washington, William Adair tried to gain approval for Confederate Cherokees to be allowed to return to the treaty lands in east Texas. It was unsuccessful. Following the death of Stand Watie in 1871, Adair reorganized the Texas Cherokees and Associate Bands (TCAB). He would lead the organization assisted by Clement Neely Vann. At this point, Mount Tabor was deeply involved in the organization.

Adair, who needed more money than that supplied by John Martin Thompson, reached out to the Fields family for financial support for continued legal action. From 1871 to 1963, the TCAB filed suits in an effort to gain more compensation for treaty violations. The first were filed against the State of Texas from 1871–1875, after which the state changed its constitution, which blocked further attempts. The TCAB sought land through filing liens in Rusk and Smith counties in 1914, and reached the United States Supreme Court on appeal in 1920–21, and the Indian Claims Commission in 1949–1953. The suit of 1963 was led chiefly by the Cherokee Nation of Oklahoma and did not include the Mount Tabor Indian Community.

Following the deaths of William Adair and Clement Vann, John Martin Thompson took over the chairmanship of both the Executive Committee and Mount Tabor. He remained in that position until his death 1907. John Ellis Bean then served both as the local community chief and TCAB executive committee chairman. In 1915, at a meeting of the General Assembly held in Tahlequah, Oklahoma, with nearly 500 Texas Cherokee present, Jake Claude Muskrat was elected the next TCAB executive committee chairman. He was the first TCAB chairman who had not lived at Mount Tabor.  Muskrat, a descendant of Chief Richard Fields, was succeeded in 1939 by W.W. Keeler.  U.S. President Harry Truman appointed Keeler as Principal Chief of the Cherokee Nation in 1949. He served in both capacities with the Cherokee Nation and TCAB until 1972, when the Cherokee Nation established a constitution for electoral government.

After the death of Thompson, the Texas Cherokees and Associate Bands became more influenced by the majority of Cherokee in Oklahoma. During the 1920 effort to appeal to the U.S. Supreme Court, a major schism developed between TCAB attorney George Fields and Texas leader Martin Luther Thompson. Fields contended that this was a Cherokee Nation effort. Fields wanted the Choctaw to be excluded from the Cherokee Nation.  He struck the word "Choctaw" out of his papers related to the case.  He left the word Jawanie (Yowani), included in the original treaty, but Martin Thompson's believed that not all Mount Tabor Choctaw (including his wife) were Yowani.  Fields tried to push out the Mount Tabor descendants, but stopped short due to pressures by Claude Muskrat and John Ellis Bean.

Texas Oil Boom
In Texas, the community maintained its local leadership. Following the death of John Ellis Bean in 1927, J. Malcolm Crim took over as leader, with Martin Luther Thompson as his second. The Great Depression hit the area hard, but was dramatically relieved by the discovery of oil on October 3, 1930 by Columbus M. "Dad" Joiner, at  Daisy Bradford #3 near Kilgore, and soon thereafter at Lou Della Crim #1. This was followed by many more in areas occupied by the Tabor people. Lou Della Thompson-Crim was the daughter of John Martin Thompson. This discovery changed her life and many others forever. The 1930 oil boom was a two-edged sword for the Mount Tabor Community. It lifted up many of the band out of poverty, but the newfound wealth destroyed traditional indigenous culture, transforming it overnight. Malcolm Crim looked to help both Cherokees and Choctaws within the community. One story from the Oil Museum in Kilgore, relates to the Choctaw-Chickasaw family from the Screech Owl Bend community, a sub-community of Mount Tabor. The story shows the change that the oil boom brought to the community. Leota Florey a non-Native married to Walter Tucker a Choctaw-Chickasaw and grandson of Hugh McCoy Thompson, had inherited 301 acres in 1904. As oil was being discovered in the community lands, Leota and Walter had help from Malcolm Crim to insure the family received the royalties owed. The Oil Museum has a quote from Leota about that time period; "She held onto the land, and in the early 1930s--the East Texas Oil field! Leota, who had cooked and scrubbed and scrounged and lived in a tent during the drilling of the first two dry holes on Daisy Bradford's farm, told J. Malcolm Crim when Daisy Bradford #3 came in, "I'll never wring out another dishrag in my life!"

As a businessman, Malcolm Crim did well for the community, ensuring that many descendants from Kilgore to Troup were not taken advantage of by the abundance of less than scrupulous individuals who flooded into tribal areas. Over a four-week period Kilgore went from a sleepy town of 500, with a sizable Native population, to a city of 10,000, made up of rough migrants and speculators. Change was inevitable even with Malcolm Crim as the first mayor of Kilgore.

By 1933, Crim was focused on his own business interests. Foster Trammell Bean became the next community Chief. Foster Bean was the grandson of Chief John Ellis Bean. He served as a local attorney, judge, and as mayor of Kilgore for twenty years. He maintained a good relationship with W.W. Keeler, but served only intermittently on the TCAB Executive Committee. With the death of Martin Luther Thompson in 1946, all local leadership was concentrated under Judge Bean.

1972 to present
In 1972, as the Cherokee Nation was reorganizing and grew more politically distant from the Mount Tabor Community. Keeler had been reappointed Principal Chief by every U.S. President from Truman to Nixon. In anticipation of more changes and with Native American activism focused on local control, he resigned as Chairman of the Texas Cherokees and Associate Bands. Foster Bean assumed all responsibilities, making the TCAB again reflect only a local Texas organization. With the approval of the 1975 Cherokee Nation constitution, the TCAB ceased to exist in Oklahoma without a vote. Since, it has been active only in Texas. Some Oklahoma Cherokee have continued to serve on the Executive Committee, such as Mack Starr and George Bell, but after 1980 all Executive Committee members have been tied to Mount Tabor in Texas only.

Judge Foster Bean served as Chairman of the Executive Committee of the TCAB until 1988. J.C. Thompson was appointed by the Committee to replace him. Bean remained a member of the Executive Committee, which included Billy Bob Crim, R. Nicholas Hearne, and Saunders Gregg.

Thompson first addressed the community's standing as a recognized tribe. The Mount Tabor Community was never like larger bands or nations with a constitutional government or council. The Executive Committee acted as the sole government for day to day activities, the General Assembly, all blood descendants in this loose organization as compared to the larger tribes like the Cherokee or Choctaw Nations. Although some minimal bylaws were developed in the 70s, it was not until the 1998 constitution was passed that the government of the community changed. Secondly, he suggested changes to the name of the organization. The organization no longer used "Mount Tabor" and was only known as the Texas Cherokees and Associate Bands, Texas Cherokees or Texas Band. Since the Executive Committee saw that the TCAB as the dual state organization, which after 1975 only remained viable in Texas. The committee proposed the name" Texas Band of Cherokee, Choctaw and Chickasaw Indians". That, and the proposed "Texas Band of Cherokee Indians" were both rejected by the General Assembly, made up of all adult members.

The Choctaw descendants were offended by the latter proposal, they felt slighted, even though many are both Choctaw and Cherokee. The compromise in 1992 was to return to the band's original name, plus retaining the TCAB title. Since then the official name has been the Texas Cherokees and Associate Bands of the Mount Tabor Indian Community.  With the explosion of fraudulent groups claiming to be "Cherokee Tribes", the Executive Committee in 1998 no longer referred to the community by the TCAB title, but as Mount Tabor. The Executive Committee and General Assembly do not consider the community to be neither a Cherokee, Choctaw, Chickasaw, or Muscogee-Creek tribe or band, but rather a combination of peoples who have are an interrelated band by blood, marriage and history.

J.C. Thompson served as Chairman until 1998, when Terry Jean Easterly was selected as the first woman to lead the community. Easterly is also the first leader who has not had Cherokee ancestry. She is Choctaw, Chickasaw and Creek, a descendant of both the Thompson-McCoy and Jones families through Arthur Thompson, brother of William C. Thompson. She served from 1998 to 2000 and was succeeded by Peggy Dean-Atwood, a descendant of Archibald Thompson, who also had no Cherokee ancestry. Atwood served through 2001. After her resignation, J.C. Thompson became Chairman for the second time. He served until August 2018, when he was succeeded by William Ellis "Billy" Bean, the great-grandson of Chief John Ellis Bean. Chairman Bean served only 13 months ending on September 2, 2019. He was succeeded by Cheryl Aleane Giordano, the third woman to hold the position. Ms. Giordano is a descendant of the Thompson-McCoy family and is of Choctaw and Chickasaw descent. She had previously served as Operations Coordinator on the Mount Tabor Executive Committee.

Modern Mount Tabor Indian Community
In 1978 the band set up its first bylaws that were distinct from the 1925 Texas Cherokee and Associate Band by-laws. In 1998, the band approved a new constitution as part of their effort to meet federal standards for self-government and to gain federal recognition as a tribe by the Secretary of Interior in their Federal Acknowledgment Project. The band started seeking federal recognition in 1990 but the project was tabled in 1992, in part due to a misunderstanding of the criteria established by the Bureau of Indian Affairs (in consultation with tribes). The band revived its current Federal project in 2015.

In the early 21st century, the band holds an annual reunion usually in either Kilgore or Troup. It maintains strong connections to three of their traditional cemeteries, the Asbury  Cemetery near Overton; the Thompson Cemetery at Laird Hill; and the Mount Tabor Indian Cemetery in rural Rusk County.  Additionally, the band publishes a quarterly newspaper, The Mount Tabor Phoenix.

Nonprofit organization 
In 2015, J.C. Thompson registered the Mount Tabor Indian Heritage Center, a 501(c)(3) nonprofit organization, based in Kilgore, Texas. Thompson was the organization's president in 2018.

Leadership 

While Benjamin Franklin Thompson purchased lands that would become Mount Tabor in the spring of 1844, few Cherokees actually began residing there before 1847, with Choctaw, Chickasaw and Muscogee Creek people joining the community between 1847 and 1850. Devereaux Bell while being in Texas after 1840, it doesn't appear he established himself as part of the community until shortly before his brother John Adair Bell arrived in Texas to stay in 1852. All of the families were fully established by 1853. The leadership from 1853 to 1900 was minimal with a community leader that local Natives turned to in times of need or to organize events. This was interrupted by the Civil War, although George Starr was looked to as well as Stand Watie being regarded as Chief. The Choctaw, Chickasaw and Muscogees of the community looked to George Starr and John Martin Thompson during the war years. John Thompson being the main organizer for Confederate units of those that didn't go to Indian Territory with Watie's men.

If decisions needed to be made the entire community came together for a decision. This form of government as represented in the General Assembly was adopted in to the 1998 constitution and remains as the legislative part of Mount Tabor today. The addition of the Executive Committee relates to the connection with the Texas Cherokees and Associate Bands. This organization based in IT after the Civil War was relied upon as part of he leadership of Mount Tabor as well, although a local leader or chief was still utilized as can be seen in organizational activities related to everything from the Dawes Commission and Guion Miller enrollment, to the oil boom, or even social activities such as the communities involvement in local cultural events like the 1939 heritage days parade in Longview, Texas.

The General Assembly and Annual Reunion has been held specifically since 1939 with three cancelled during the years of WWII until 2001. The assembly did not meet between 2002 and 2004. A brief meeting was held in 2005 and then restructured in 2015 and held again annually since.

With the 1998 constitution, the government became three tiered with a seven member Executive Committee, initially with a Chief Justice, that position held by Saunders Gregg alone. In 2017 the change to a three member tribunal brought the current tribal government into its present order.

Prior to 1998, other than two attempts at drafting By Laws, the community did not operate like other tribes as it was not a formal nation or band, but a small community made up of five extended families. Two additional families have been recognized since then. Other changes deal with the group's name. The community has been known since its inception first as Mount Taber and Bellvue communities then as Texas Cherokees. References to the group prior to 1990 was Texas Cherokees or Texas Band as a part of the Texas Cherokees and Associate Bands. Part of this had to do with Cherokees being in positions of leadership from the beginning. It is however a misnomer as while the seven recognized families are made up of four well documented Cherokee families (Martin; Bean; Harnage and Fish), the three additional documented families are Choctaw, Chickasaw and Muscogee Creek. Since 1900 the population of the community has become predominately Choctaw/Chickasaw.

In 1990 it was discussed the need to officially take one name that reflected the entire community, in particular the "Associate Bands". Initially the Texas Band of Cherokee, Choctaw and Chickasaw was considered. The final decision that was approved by the General Assembly was one that reflected the traditional original name of the community, yet maintained the Texas tie to the TCAB. Thus the official name of the community was adopted as the Texas Cherokees an Associate Bands of the Mount Tabor Indian Community. However, while that was the legal name, due to the number of fraudulent groups calling themselves Cherokee tribes, it was determined to only utilize the Mount Tabor Indian Community, the traditional name given the community in 1853 by John Adair Bell, this didn't distinguish any particular tribe but showed how the four tribes became one. The name has remained the same since that time.

Membership 

Mount Tabor membership is limited to lineal descendants of seven extended families, represented by specific progenitors whose family remained within or in contact with the Mount Tabor Indian Community from 1850 to the present. The seven primary progenitors are:
1. Annie Martin-Thompson, a Cherokee Indian and her husband Benjamin Franklin Thompson;
2. John Ellis Bean and his wife Henrietta Cloud Dannenberg-Bean, both Cherokee Indians;
3. Nannie Sabina Harnage-Bacon a Cherokee Indian and her husband John Dana Bacon;
4. Margaret McCoy-Thompson, a Choctaw & Chickasaw Indian and her husband Henry Thompson through their sons:
a. Henry Thompson Jr and his wife Percilla Jackson-Thompson, a Choctaw Indian (only his descendants that settled in Rusk, Smith or Gregg counties)
b. Archibald Thompson and his wives Elizabeth Jackson-Thompson, a Choctaw Indian; Nancy Islea, ancestry unknown; Anna Strong Thompson, non-Indian (only his descendants that settled in Rusk, Smith or Gregg counties)
c. William Thompson and his wife Elizabeth Jones Mangum-Thompson, a Choctaw Indian (all of his descendants, including those that relocated to Trinity and Angelina counties as long as they can document continued contact with the community);
5. Samuel Jones aka Nashoba, a Choctaw Indian (only his descendants that settled in Rusk, Smith, Gregg counties);
6. Martha Elizabeth Derrisaw-Berryhill (Durouzeaux), a Muscogee-Creek Indian and her husband John Berryhill, a Catawba Indian, (only his descendants that settled in Rusk, Smith, Gregg counties).
7. Lucy Fish-Gage a Cherokee Indian and her husband David Gage.

Other families may qualify based upon lineal descent from an ancestor(s) who were part of the historical community but are now members of the Cherokee Nation; Choctaw Nation of Oklahoma; Chickasaw Nation; Jena Band of Choctaw Indians, or Muscogee Creek Nation. These families are limited to parts of the Adair, Bell, Buffington and Starr Cherokee families.

The Mount Tabor Indian Community is a lineal descendant band that does not have a minimum tribal blood quantum for membership.

Mount Tabor chiefs and leaders

Mount Tabor Community leaders/chiefs
 1847–1853: Devereaux Jarrett Bell
 1853–1860: John Adair "Jack" Bell
 1860–1861: George Harlan Starr
 1861–1881: Major John Martin Thompson
 1881–1902: Chief Caleb Starr Bean
 1927–1933: John Malcolm Crim
 1933–1988: Judge Foster Trammell Bean
 1988–1998: J.C. Thompson
 1998–2000: Terry Jean Easterly
 2000–2001: Peggy Dean-Atwood
 2001–2018: J.C. Thompson
 2018–2018: Billy Bean
 2019–Present: Cheryl Giordano

Texas Choctaw/Chickasaw leaders
 1847–1851: Jeremiah Jones
 1851–1856: Archibald Thompson
 1856–1864: Lieutenant John Thurston Thompson Sr. (killed in the Battle of Jenkins Ferry, Saline County, Arkansas during the American Civil War)
 (1881–1946): Martin Luther Thompson
 1890–1912: Captain William Clyde Thompson (elected Texas Choctaw Leader for those in the Chickasaw Nation)

Muscogee Creek leaders
 1847–1865: William Berryhill and his brother Thomas Berryhill

Other notable Mount Tabor Indians

 Charles Collins Thompson
 John Martin Thompson
 Martin Luther Thompson
 Stand Watie
 William Clyde Thompson
 William Penn Adair
 William Thomas Gilcrease
 W.W. Keeler

Texas Cherokee; Mount Tabor related treaties and Texas State recognition
 Treaty of San Antonio de Bexar, with the Spanish Empire, November 8, 1822
Granted lands in the province of Tejas and Coahuila in Spanish Mexico for permanent settlement of the Texas Cherokee Nation, represented by Chief Richard Fields. Although signed by the Spanish governor of Tejas, the treaty was never ratified, neither by the Vice-royalty of New Spain nor by any succeeding government through the Texas Revolution.
 Treaty with the Republic of Fredonia, December 21, 1826
Treaty with the short-lived Fredonia Republic. The rebellion led to the death of Chief Richard Fields.
 Treaty of Bowles Village with the Republic of Texas, February 23, 1836
This treaty granted nearly 1,600,000 acres (6,500 km2) of east Texas land to the Texas Cherokees and twelve associated tribes, including the Yowani (Jawanie). It was the violation of this treaty that led directly to the Cherokee War of 1839. The treaty included all of Cherokee and Smith counties, the northwestern part of Rusk, northeastern Van Zandt and southern Gregg (formed from Rusk County in 1873) counties.
 Treaty of Bird's Fort with the Republic of Texas, September 29, 1843
Ending hostilities among several Texas tribes, including the Texas Cherokees as negotiated by Chicken Trotter. This treaty which was ratified by the Congress of the Republic of Texas, recognized the tribal status of the Texas Indians as distinct, including the Cherokees that would later become known as the Mount Tabor Indian Community. This treaty ending hostilities allowed for President Polk to authorize Cherokees of the Old Settler and Ridge Party to go to Texas to seek lands to settle on. Without this treaty it is doubtful that any would have traveled through Texas before annexation. This treaty, honored by the State of Texas following annexation, has never been abrogated by the Congress of the United States and in theory is still valid.
 Treaty of Tehuacana Creek with the Republic of Texas, October 9, 1844. An additional treaty was made in which Chicken Trotter and Wagon Bowles were involved, the latter being the son of Texas Cherokee Chief Bowles also known as Duwa'li or the Bowl. This treaty was approved by the Texas Senate only.
 Second Treaty of Tehuacana Creek with the Republic of Texas, August 27 to September 25, 1845. The Council of Tehuacana Creek was the last official contact between the Republic of Texas and many of its tribes. This treaty was never ratified as Texas was soon to be annexed into the United States of America. In this treaty Wagon Bowles is acknowledged as Chief of the Cherokees, whereas Chicken Trotter is titled Captain. It is unclear if any of the Old Settler or Ridge Party Cherokees participated, although based upon the dates of the council it is a good possibility.
 Texas Senate Resolution 384, a congratulatory resolution, passed March 17, 2015
 Texas Senate Concurrent Resolution 25, a congratulatory resolution, passed May 10, 2017
 Texas Senate Bill 2363, sponsored by Senator Bryan Hughes (R), to establish state-recognition for the Mount Tabor Indian Community, introduced on March 8, 2019, died March 21, 2019

References

Further reading
  Handbook of American Indians North of Mexico, Part I; Frederick Webb Hodge" 1907 edit.; Miscellaneous Publications. 3; re-pub:2019.
 A History of the Caddo Indians By: Glover, William B.

1925 establishments in Texas
2015 establishments in Texas
Native American tribes in Texas
Non-profit organizations based in Texas
Cherokee heritage groups
Chickasaw
Choctaw heritage groups
Muscogee
Unrecognized tribes in the United States